Miki Ito (born 10 September 1995) is a Japanese professional footballer who plays as a midfielder for WE League club INAC Kobe Leonessa.

Club career 
Nishikawa made her WE League debut on 12 September 2021.

References 

1995 births
Living people
Japanese women's footballers
Women's association football midfielders
INAC Kobe Leonessa players
WE League players
Association football people from Aomori Prefecture